Nava de la Asunción is a municipality located in the province of Segovia, Castile and León, Spain. According to the 2004 census (INE), the municipality has a population of 2,645 inhabitants. The municipality holds many festivals.

Villages
Nava de la Asunción
Moraleja de Coca

Notable natives and residents
 Jaime Gil de Biedma, poet

References

External links
 Official website

Municipalities in the Province of Segovia